The French destroyer Téméraire was one of four s that was built for the Argentine Navy in the early 1910s. The ships were taken over by the French Navy after the start of the First World War in August 1914. She was stricken in 1936 and subsequently scrapped.

Design and description 
The Aventurier-class ships were significantly larger and more heavily armed than other French destroyers of the period. Their crew numbered 140 men.

The ships were powered by a pair of Rateau steam turbines, each driving one propeller shaft using steam provided by five mixed-firing Foster-Wheeler boilers.

The primary armament of the Aventurier-class ships consisted of four  guns in single mounts, one on the forecastle, one between the funnels, and two on the quarterdeck, in front and behind the searchlight platform. They were fitted with a  AA gun for anti-aircraft defence. The ships were also equipped with four single mounts for  torpedo tubes amidships.

Construction and career
Téméraire was ordered from Ateliers et Chantiers de Bretagne and was launched on 8 December 1911 with the name of San Juan at its Nantes shipyard. The ship was completed on 2 November 1914. She was stricken in 1936 and broken up for scrap.

Citations

References

1911 ships
Aventurier-class destroyers
Ships built in France